Jim Veitch (8 January 1905 – 3 August 1987) was an  Australian rules footballer who played with Hawthorn in the Victorian Football League (VFL).

Notes

External links 

1905 births
1987 deaths
Australian rules footballers from Melbourne
Hawthorn Football Club players
People from Collingwood, Victoria